The 1995 season of the 3. divisjon, the fourth highest association football league for men in Norway.

Between 22 and 24 games (depending on group size) were played in 19 groups, with 3 points given for wins and 1 for draws. All group winners were promoted to the 2. divisjon, as well as some of the best runners-up.

Tables 

Group 1
Selbak – promoted
Østsiden
Kvik Halden
Lisleby
Rygge
Tune
Askim
Trøgstad/Båstad
Greåker
Torp – relegated
Kråkerøy – relegated
Tistedalen – relegated

Group 2
Grei – promoted
Grorud
Rælingen
Aurskog/Finstadbru
Sel
Hammerseng
Gjelleråsen
Lillehammer FK
Vinstra
Stovnerkameratene – relegated
Lom – relegated
Fjellhamar – relegated

Group 3
Frigg – promoted
Grue
Årvoll
Kongsvinger 2
Galterud
KFUM
Nes
Bjerke
Fagerborg
Kjellmyra – relegated
Eidsvold IF – relegated
Vålerenga 2 – relegated

Group 4
Abildsø – promoted
Mercantile
Kolbotn
Holmen
Bækkelaget
Fart
Stabæk
Nordstrand
Oppegård
Ottestad – relegated
Vang – relegated
Brumunddal – relegated

Group 5
Raufoss – promoted
Gjøvik-Lyn
Biri
Drafn
Kolbu/KK
Vardal
Åmot
Skiold
Skreia – relegated
Strømsgodset 2 – relegated
Vikersund – relegated
Slemmestad – relegated

Group 6
Teie – promoted
Larvik Turn
Skotfoss
Snøgg
Stokke
Tjølling
Flint
Storm
Holmestrand
Nøtterøy – relegated
Gulset – relegated
Gjekstad & Østerøya – relegated

Group 7
Vindbjart – promoted, won all games
Jerv
Langesund
Mandalskameratene
Lyngdal
Urædd
Sørfjell
Stathelle
Kvinesdal
Donn – relegated
Drangedal – relegated
Tveit – relegated

Group 8
Eiger – promoted
Varhaug
Ulf-Sandnes
Stavanger
Nærbø
Figgjo
Ganddal
Buøy
Riska
Staal
Sunde – relegated
Mosterøy – relegated

Group 9
Stord – promoted
Sola
Vadmyra
Åkra
Florvåg
Odda
Trott
Skjold
Nymark
Skjergard – relegated
Rosseland – relegated
Sandviken – relegated

Group 10
Løv-Ham – promoted
Ny-Krohnborg
Lyngbø
Follese
Telavåg
Brann 2
Voss
Bjarg
Hovding
Bergen Sparta – relegated
Årstad – relegated
Varegg – relegated

Group 11
Stryn – promoted
Jotun
Førde
Tornado
Sandane
Høyang
Måløy
Jølster
Fjøra
Eid
Kaupanger – relegated
Eikefjord – relegated

Group 12
Brattvåg – promoted
Velledalen og Ringen
Hødd 2
Hareid
Åram
Volda
Aksla
Valder
Langevåg
Spjelkavik
Sykkylven – relegated
Stordal – relegated
Vigra – relegated

Group 13
Molde 2 – promoted
Averøykameratene
Sunndal
Tomrefjord
Surnadal
Træff
Bryn
Isfjorden
Moldekameratene – relegated
Måndalen – relegated
Gossen – relegated
Eide og Omegn – relegated

Group 14
Nationalkameratene – promoted
Ranheim
Tynset
KIL/Hemne
Røros
Strindheim 2
Heimdal
Hitra
Brekken
Gimse – relegated
Charlottenlund – relegated
Oppdal – relegated

Group 15
Namsos – promoted
Sverre
Kvamskameratene
Nidelv
Tranabakkan
Nessegutten
Bangsund
Vuku
Fosen
Rissa
Vikingan – relegated
Sørlia – relegated

Group 16
Sandnesssjøen – promoted
Grand Bodø
Mosjøen
Brønnøysund
Åga
Bodøkameratene
Sørfold
Saltdalkameratene
Sømna
Nesna
Tverlandet – relegated
Halsakameratene – relegated

Group 17
Morild – promoted
Narvik/Nor
Leknes
Medkila
Flakstad
Vågakameratene
Landsås
Beisfjord
Stokmarknes
Skånland
Kvæfjord – relegated
Ajaks – relegated

Group 18
Finnsnes – promoted
Ulfstind
Nordreisa
Salangen
Balsfjord
Tromsdalen 2
Tromsø 2
Ramfjord
Ringvassøy
Mellembygd
Fløya – relegated
Kåfjord – relegated
Vannøy – relegated

Group 19
Porsanger – promoted
Bjørnevatn
Hammerfest
Kirkenes
Bossekop
Polarstjernen
Norild
Alta 2
Nordkinn
Nordlys
Sørøy Glimt
Lakselv – relegated
Bølgen – relegated

References

Norwegian Third Division seasons
4
Norway
Norway